B.N.M. Institute of Technology (also Bhageerathi Bai Narayana Rao Maanay Institute of Technology) is an autonomous private technical co-educational engineering education institution located in Bangalore, Karnataka, India. It was established in 2001 and is affiliated to the Visvesvaraya Technological University, Belgaum.

About
BNMEI – B.N.M. Educational Institutions were established by the trust Bhageerathi Bai Narayana Rao Maanay Charities in 1972. The Managing Trustee N. Raghunath Rao Maanay - along with Sunanda P Jadhav, the founder, Secretary and Principal, founded the institution with a focused vision to impart value-based quality education irrespective of social, financial or religious status.

Rankings

The National Institutional Ranking Framework (NIRF) ranked it 186 among engineering colleges in 2020.

References

External links
 

Engineering colleges in Bangalore
Affiliates of Visvesvaraya Technological University
Educational institutions established in 2001
2001 establishments in Karnataka